Broadcast Film Critics Association Awards 1997 may refer to:

 3rd Critics' Choice Awards, the third Critics' Choice Awards ceremony that took place in 1998
 4th Critics' Choice Awards, the fourth Critics' Choice Awards ceremony that took place in 1999 and which honored the best in film for 1998